In mathematics, a Horikawa surface is one of the  surfaces of general type introduced by Horikawa.
These are surfaces with q = 0 and pg = c12/2 + 2 or c12/2 + 3/2 (which implies that they are more or less on the Noether line edge of the region of possible values of the Chern numbers). 
They are all simply connected, and Horikawa gave a detailed description of them.

References

Algebraic surfaces
Complex surfaces